Pop as a Weapon (often mis-credited as "More Songs About Hair") is a compilation album from Orange County pop punk band Supernova, released in 2001 by Sympathy for the Record Industry.

The album contains material recorded between 1992 and 1994 that was only previously available on vinyl.

Track listing
All lyrics written by Supernova.

"Intro/Backyard Boat" – 4:28
"Calling Hong Kong" – 2:27
"Disco Fur" – 2:15
"Costa Mesa Hates Me" – 2:39
"Chewbacca" – 1:21
"Choke the Fuzz" (live) – 2:05
"Bad Haircut" – 3:24
"Long Hair and Tattoos" – 3:07
"Supersong" – 2:52
"Our Way or Highway" – 0:59
"Drool" – 1:15
"Electric Man" – 3:37
"Refuse Worker #2" – 1:02
"Costa Mesa Hates Me Pt. 2" – 1:28

Tracks 1–5, 7–11 were recorded at Pyramid Productions by Virgil Gentile, 1992–1994
Track 6 was recorded live at Our House in Costa Mesa, 1993
Tracks 12–13 were recorded at Saturation Studios by Geoff Harrington, 1993
Tracks 8, 10, and 11 were originally on the Long Hair & Tattoos 7".
Tracks 2 and 5 were originally on the Calling Hong Kong 7".
Tracks 12, 13, and 6 were originally on the Electric Man 7".
Tracks 4 and 14 were originally on the Costa Mesa Hates Me 7".

Personnel
Art Mitchell – Vocals, bass guitar
Hayden 'Hank' Thais – Guitar, vocals
Dave Collins – Drums, vocals

Supernova (American band) albums
2001 albums